The Canal Street Schoolhouse is a historic school building on Canal Street in Brattleboro, Vermont.  Built in 1892 out of locally quarried stone, it is a fine local example of Colonial Revival architecture.  It was listed on the National Register of Historic Places in 1977.

Description and history
The Canal Street Schoolhouse stands southwest of downtown Brattleboro, on a rise above the south side of Canal Street (United States Route 5), a major thoroughfare.  It is a two-story stone structure, topped by a hip roof and set on a stone foundation.  Its front half is nearly bisected by a projecting square tower, which is capped by an open octagonal belfry and cupola.  The main facade, facing Canal Street, is symmetrical, with the main entrance in the tower base, flanked by sidelight windows, and sheltered by a semicircular portico supported by Doric columns.  Above the entrance are windows arranged in Palladian fashion, the three sections each set in separate openings.  A circular clock face is set on the tower's third stage, which is surmounted by a low balustrade and the belfry.  The tower is flanked by single sash windows on the first floor and oval windows on the second, with bands of three sash windows at the outermost bays.

The school was built in 1892, and is notable for its Colonial Revival styling, executed in local material instead of the more typical brick.  The designers of the building are uncertain; a design was prepared by the firm of McKim, Meade & White, but the drawings are credited to one Robert Gordon Hardie, about whom nothing is known.  It is possible that Hardie was an employee of McKim, Meade & White.  The clock was paid for by a local fundraising effort, and the bell was cast by the Meneely Bell Foundry of Troy, New York and installed in 1893.  At the time of its listing on the National Register in 1977, it was the only known operable school bell in the state.

See also
National Register of Historic Places listings in Windham County, Vermont

References

School buildings on the National Register of Historic Places in Vermont
Colonial Revival architecture in Vermont
School buildings completed in 1892
Buildings and structures in Brattleboro, Vermont
Schools in Windham County, Vermont
National Register of Historic Places in Windham County, Vermont